Telmatobius bolivianus is a species of frog in the family Telmatobiidae. It is endemic to the Eastern Andes of Bolivia. It was formerly the most common and widespread Telmatobius of Bolivia, but has had a drastic population decline since the mid-2000s. It is an aquatic frog occurring in fast-flowing rivers and streams in cloud forest and Yungas forest. It is threatened by chytridomycosis as well as habitat loss caused by logging and agricultural expansion. Water pollution and aquaculture are also threats.

References

bolivianus
Endemic fauna of Bolivia
Amphibians of Bolivia
Amphibians of the Andes
Taxonomy articles created by Polbot
Amphibians described in 1940